The Brown Bears women’s ice hockey program is an NCAA Division I ice hockey team that represents Brown University. The Bears play at the Meehan Auditorium in Providence, Rhode Island. Brown women's hockey is the oldest women's hockey program in the United States. It was the first collegiate women's ice hockey program in the United States, started in 1964. The team was led from 1989 to 2011 by Head Coach Digit Murphy, who became the winningest coach in Division I women's ice hockey history during her 18th season at Brown (2006–2007).

History
Brown University Women's Ice Hockey is widely regarded as being one of the premier collegiate programs globally. Several former players are Olympic medal winners.

In 1964, the Brown Bears men's coach Jim Fullerton arranged for Nancy Schieffelin to attend a team practice. She was an experienced player and came to the practice disguised in full uniform. A year later, Brown University would have the first women’s ice hockey program. The team was known as the Pembroke Pandas. The Pandas would have to borrow equipment, and sell hockey rule sheets at the Bears men's games to raise money for equipment. In February 1966, the Pandas (Brown Bears) women’s ice hockey team played their first game. Against the Walpole Brooms, the club lost by a 4–1 score.

In 1976, Brown would host the first ever Ivy League women's ice hockey tournament. The other competing schools were Cornell, Princeton and Yale. The Big Red would win the tournament.

Between 1994 and 1997, the Bears won three consecutive ECAC regular season championships. During that time span, the Bears were undefeated in the league during the 1995–96 and 1996–97 seasons. The undefeated streak spanned 49 ECAC games. The Bears competed in the first AWCHA Division I National Ice Hockey Championship. Contested in March 1998, the Bears were defeated by the New Hampshire Wildcats by a 4–1 score.

In 1999–2000, Brown reach its second national championship final in three years. Coach Digit Murphy, who has been building the program since 1988, used virtually every player on her bench and eventually wore out opponents. She even went so far as to take the advice of a volunteer assistant coach by allowing her centers to take turns choosing the wings on their lines. Jill Graat was named captain of the team. The team withstood a season-ending ACL injury to its best player, U.S. Olympic defenseman Tara Mounsey, and went on to win nineteen straight games entering the 2000 national championship game.

Ali Brewer holds every Brown goaltending record for a season or a career. In her four seasons with the Bears, she posted a 1.37 goals-against average and a .943 save percentage. In addition, she had 2,490 saves and posting 39 shutouts. Numerous records were set by Brewer including, a 0.94 GAA and .957 save percentage in her freshman season, 13 shutouts in her junior season, and 25 wins in her senior campaign. Another record that she holds is five consecutive shutouts, set her junior season, in which she blanked Cornell (3–0), St. Lawrence (5–0), Niagara twice (6–0 both games), and Colby (9–0).

During Brewer’s four seasons, the Bears never won fewer than 20 games in a season. The Bears won ECAC Championships in 1998 and 2000, with Brewer earning MVP honors during the 2000 Championship. The Bears also played in the AWCHA Tournament three times from 1998–2000, finishing as the National Runner-Up twice.

Current roster
As of September 7, 2022.

Olympians
Pam Dreyer (United States): 2006 Torino (Bronze)
Kim Insalaco (United States):  2006 Torino (Bronze)
Kathleen Kauth (United States): 2006 Torino (Bronze)
Becky Kellar-Duke (Canada): 1998 Nagano (Silver), 2002 Salt Lake (Gold), 2006 Torino (Gold), 2010 Vancouver (Gold)
Katie King-Crowley (United States): 1998 Nagano (Gold), 2002 Salt Lake (Silver), 2006 Torino (Bronze)
Tara Mounsey (United States): 1998 Nagano (Gold), 2002 Salt Lake (Silver)
Chie Chie Sakuma (Japan): 1998 Nagano

Awards and honors
Ali Brewer, 1998 and 2000 ECAC Tournament Most Valuable Player,
Ali Brewer, 1999 American Women's College Hockey Alliance All-Americans, First Team
Ali Brewer, Patty Kazmaier Award Finalist, 1999
Ali Brewer, Patty Kazmaier Award (2000)
Ali Brewer, Women's Ivy League Outstanding Performers (2000)
Ali Brewer, Women's First Team All-Ivy League (1999)
Ali Brewer, Women's First Team All-Ivy League (2000) 
Ali Brewer, Ivy League Player of the Year (2000)
Ali Brewer, ECAC Goaltender of the Year (2000)
Ali Brewer, First Team All-ECAC (2000)
Mardie Corcoran, 1986 Marjorie Brown Smith Award
Pam Dreyer, 2001–02 New England Hockey Writers Women's Divions I All-Star Team
Pam Dreyer, Goalie, 2002 ECAC North Second Team
Pam Dreyer, 2002 ECAC Tournament Most Valuable Player,
Katie King, Forward, 1996 All-ECAC Team
Katie King, 1997 Marjorie Brown Smith Award
Katie King, 1997 ECAC Player of the Year Award
Katie Jamieson, 2010 Second Team All-Ivy
Laurie Jolin, ECAC Rookie of the Week (Week of February 22, 2010)
Courtney Johnson, 2002 ECAC All Academic Team
Courtney Johnson, 2002 Academic All-Ivy
Courtney Johnson, US College Hockey Online Player of the Week (Jan. 14, 2002) 
 Becky Kellar, 1996 ECAC All-Tournament team
 Becky Kellar, 1996 ECAC Honor Roll
Jessica Link, Forward, 2002 ECAC North All-Rookie Team
Jessica Link, 2002 ECAC All-Rookie Team
Jessica Link, 2002 Second Team All-Ivy honors
Jessica Link, ECAC Rookie of the Week (Jan. 28, 2002)
Jessica Link, 2002 Sakuma Award winner.
 Hayley Moore, Forward, First Team All-Ivy League, 2007–08, Brown (Senior)
Kathryn Moss, 2007 Marjorie Brown Smith Award
Tara Mounsey, 1997 ECAC Rookie of the Year
Tara Mounsey, 1999 American Women's College Hockey Alliance All-Americans, Second Team
Tara Mounsey, 2000 Marjorie Brown Smith Award
Tara Mounsey, Patty Kazmaier Award Finalist,  1999, 2000
Digit Murphy, New England Hockey Writers 2001-02 Women's Coach of the Year
Paige Pyett, Defense, 2009 ECAC All-Rookie Team
Emily Sigman, 2002 ECAC All Academic Team
Christina Sorbara, 2001 Sarah Devens Award
 Nicole Stock, Second Team All-Ivy League, 2007–08, Goaltender, Brown (Junior)
Nicole Stock, Goaltender, 2009 Third Team All-ECAC
Cassie Turner, 2001–02 New England Hockey Writers Women's Divions I All-Star Team
Cassie Turner, Defense, 2002 ECAC North First Team
 Kristy Zamora, ECAC Player of the Week (Awarded December 11, 2001) 
Kristy Zamora, 2001–02 New England Hockey Writers Women's Divions I All-Star Team
Kristy Zamora, Forward, 2002 ECAC North First Team

Alli McMillan '74 Award
Emilie Bydwell 2007 Alli McMillan '74 Award as the team's unsung hero.

Chelsea McMillan '98 Award
Kim Fleet, 2002 Chelsea McMillan '98 Award for pride and perseverance
Emilie Bydwell 2006 Chelsea McMillan '98 Award for pride and perseverance.

Kate Silver '86 Award
In recognition of an outstanding first year female varsity athlete at Brown University
Katie King, Kate Silver '86 Award (1994)
Jessica Link, Kate Silver '86 Award (2002)
Kathryn Moss, Kate Silver '86 Award (2004)
Tara Mounsey, Kate Silver '86 Award (1997)

Sakuma Award
The Sakuma Award is a team award given for perfect attendance at practices and games.
Kim Fleet, 2002 Sakuma Award winner for perfect attendance at all practices and games.
Courtney Johnson 2000, 2001 Sakuma Award winner for perfect attendance at practices and games.
Kristy Zamora, 1999, 2000

Ivy League honors
Kristy Zamora, Brown, 2002 Ivy League Player of the Year

All-Ivy
Kristy Zamora, Forward, Senior, 2002 First Team All-Ivy League
Cassie Turner, Defense, Junior, 2002 First Team All-Ivy League
Katie Germain, Goalie, Sophomore, 2002 First Team All-Ivy League
Jessica Link, Forward, Freshman, 2002 Second Team All-Ivy League
Meredith Ostrander, Defense, Senior, 2002 All-Ivy League Honorable Mention
 Sam Donovan, 2017-18 Honorable Mention All-Ivy

Bears in professional hockey

See also
Brown Bears men's ice hockey
Brown Bears
 List of college women's ice hockey coaches with 250 wins (Digit Murphy ranks fourth on all-time list)

References

External links
Brown Bears women's ice hockey

 
Ice hockey teams in Rhode Island
1964 establishments in Rhode Island
Ice hockey clubs established in 1964